Elgonina dimorphica is a species of tephritid or fruit flies in the genus Elgonina of the family Tephritidae.

Distribution
The Elgonina dimorphica is found in Ethiopia.

References

Tephritinae
Insects described in 2006
Diptera of Africa